Route 113 is a numbered state highway running  in Rhode Island. The route connects Route 2 and Route 117 in the city of Warwick.

Route description

Route 113 begins as East Avenue at Route 2 (Bald Hill Road) in the East Natick section of Warwick, near the Rhode Island Mall. Past the mall, Route 113 crosses over the southern junction of Interstate 95 (I-95) and I-295. There is no access from Route 113 to northbound I-295. Soon after the 95/295 junction, Route 113 intersects with Route 5 (Greenwich Avenue) and continues eastward as Main Avenue. Route 113 then crosses over U.S. Route 1 (US 1) at a grade-separated intersection south of TF Green International Airport in the Greenwood neighborhood. Route 113 ends in Warwick center at Route 117 (West Shore Road).

History
Route 113 was assigned to its current routing by 1969.

Major intersections

References

External links

2019 Highway Map, Rhode Island

113
Transportation in Kent County, Rhode Island